Mahir Karić (born 5 March 1992) is a Bosnian professional footballer who plays as a midfielder for Bosnian Premier League club Olimpik.

He previously played with Rudar Prijedor, Travnik, Baník Most 1909, Slavija Sarajevo, Vitez, Borac Banja Luka and Happy Valley.

Career

Happy Valley
On 14 August 2018, Karić left Europe after playing football there for 7 years and signed with Hong Kong First Division club Happy Valley.  He scored 17 goals in 25 games and helped the club to promote to the Hong Kong Premier League in the 2019–20 season. On 28 May 2020, Happy Valley announced that Karić would leave the club at the end of his contract.

Olimpik
On 29 September 2020, Karić signed a contract with Bosnian Premier League club Olimpik. He made his official debut for the club in a league loss against Željezničar on 17 October 2020.

Honours
Happy Valley
Hong Kong First Division: 2018–19

References

External links

HKFA

1992 births
Living people
Footballers from Sarajevo
Association football midfielders
Bosnia and Herzegovina footballers
Bosnia and Herzegovina expatriate footballers
Expatriate footballers in Hong Kong
Bosnia and Herzegovina expatriate sportspeople in Hong Kong
Premier League of Bosnia and Herzegovina players
Hong Kong First Division League players
Hong Kong Premier League players
FK Rudar Prijedor players
NK Travnik players
FK Slavija Sarajevo players
FK Olimpik players
NK Vitez players
FK Borac Banja Luka players
Happy Valley AA players